Wes Carroll  (born September 27, 1970, in Schererville, Indiana) is known as a pioneer and teacher of mouth drumming, a form of vocal percussion from the musical genre of contemporary a cappella, now widely known as beatboxing.

Career in A cappella music

Wes Carroll is one of the pioneering practitioners of mouth drumming a form of vocal percussion primarily through instructional videos and DVDs, first teaching the art in 1995. 
This art is now widely known as beatboxing and is a derivative of contemporary a cappella music.

Carroll was the vocal percussionist for the Boston vocal band Five O'Clock Shadow, and later joined the San-Francisco based "rock band without instruments" The House Jacks, founded by Deke Sharon.

He is a 1988 graduate of Culver Military Academy and holds a degree from MIT.

Carroll also teaches mathematics and is a puzzle enthusiast.

References

External links
 New York Times (cached) "New York Times: Doo-Wop-A-Doo Will No Longer Do"
 beatboxing.com "Beatboxing.com interview with Wes Carroll"
 housejacks.com The House Jacks
 Mouthdrumming.com Promotional site
 a-cappella.com Published Works
 casa.org "Vocal Percussion monthly with Wes Carroll"
 casa.org "Wes Carroll voted Favorite Vocal Percussionist"
 General-Anzieger "Alltag raus, Spaß rein, Tür zu"
 harmony-sweepstakes.com "Wes Carroll Vocal Percussion award" inaugurated
 Other Press (cached) "Wes in the Press"

1970 births
Living people
Culver Academies alumni
Place of birth missing (living people)
21st-century American singers
The House Jacks members